Justin Lawrence may refer to:
 Justin Lawrence (born 1990), American professional mixed martial artist
 Justin Lawrence (baseball) (born 1994), American professional baseball pitcher
 Justin Lawrence (Canadian football) (born 1996), Canadian professional offensive lineman